The 1979 Gould Dixie Twin 125 were the second and third rounds of the 1979 IndyCar season, held on April 22, at Atlanta Motor Speedway, Hampton, Georgia.

Race 1

Summary 
Johnny Rutherford won the pole for the first race, with Gordon Johncock starting second, Mike Mosley in third, Danny Ongais in fourth, and Tom Sneva in fifth. 

In the race, Rutherford and Johncock dominated the first 60 laps. After a caution period ended with just 14 laps to go, Lee Kunzman managed to jump out to the lead. Johnny Rutherford caught up to him with eight laps to go, and the two dueled, with Rutherford passing him on the penultimate lap and holding on to win. Tom Sneva claimed third, Gordon Johncock fourth, and Rick Mears fifth.

Results

Lap Leader Breakdown

Points standings after this race
Note: Only top ten are listed

Race 2

Summary 
Johnny Rutherford won the pole for the second straight race, with Lee Kunzman, Tom Sneva, Gordon Johncock, and Rick Mears rounding out the top five. The race was dominated by Rutherford, who led 61 of the 82 laps, being only challenged by Bobby Unser and Salt Walther, who led 13 laps thanks to pit shuffling. Rick Mears placed second, Al Unser, who ran out of fuel on the last lap  claimed third, Bobby Unser fourth and Tom Sneva fifth. This was the last race victory for McLaren in IndyCar until the 2021 XPEL 375 at Texas Motor Speedway when Pato O'Ward took the win.

Results

Lap Leader Breakdown

Points standings after this race
Note: Only top ten are listed

References

External links
 Full Weekend Times & Results

1979 in CART
Gould Twin Dixie 125 
Gould Twin Dixie 125